Newcastle Emlyn is a town on the River Teifi, straddling the counties of Ceredigion and Carmarthenshire in West Wales. It is also a community entirely within Carmarthenshire, bordered by those of Llangeler and Cenarth, also in Carmarthenshire, and by Llandyfriog in Ceredigion. Adpar is the part of town on the Ceredigion side of the River Teifi. It was formerly called Trefhedyn and was an ancient Welsh borough in its own right. The area including Adpar had a population of 1,883 according to the 2011 census.

History

The town takes its name from the cantref of Emlyn, an administrative district in medieval Dyfed. The cantref became part of the Norman March in the 12th century.

Its notable buildings include a ruined 13th-century castle, first mentioned in Brut y Tywysogion in 1215, when it was seized by Llewelyn the Great. It was captured by the Welsh during the revolt of 1287–1288 and also by Owain Glyndŵr in 1403.

The population in 1841 was under 1,000.

Newcastle Emlyn has a town hall and a secondary school, Ysgol Gyfun Emlyn. The town's attractions include an art gallery, the Attic Theatre company and the National Woollen Museum. The Teifi Valley Railway is nearby, although the town has not had a passenger train service since 1952.

Newcastle Emlyn hosted the Urdd National Eisteddfod in 1981.

Economy
In 1932, the former Co-operative creamery was reopened by Dried Milk Products to make cheese. After a new parent firm, Unigate, decided to sell off its non-milk related dairies, it was bought by the Milk Marketing Board in 1979, but closed again in 1983. The dairy was reopened latterly by Saputo, which now manufactures mozzarella cheese there, using locally sourced dairy produce. It has become the largest employer in the town.

Transport
In 1895, the Teifi Valley Railway of the Great Western Railway (GWR) reached Newcastle Emlyn railway station. Originally conceived as a 7 ft, ¼ inch broad-gauge line between Carmarthen and Cardigan by the Carmarthen and Cardigan Railway, it was absorbed into the GWR, which developed the line only as far as Newcastle Emlyn.

Passenger services ceased in 1952, but goods services continued until 1973, due in part to milk train services to the cheese-producing creamery. After the goods service ceased, the lines were removed and the station demolished.

Demography
According to the United Kingdom census 2011 Newcastle Emlyn had a population of 1,883, including Adpar on the Ceredigion side of the River Teifi. A 2017 population estimate put it at 1,888, of whom 52 per cent were female and 48 per cent male, with 379 aged 0–17 years, 979 aged 18–64, and 530 aged over 65.

The 2001 UK census had 69 per cent of the 950 people then living in Newcastle Emlyn speaking fluent Welsh, although the proportion fell in the next decade to 54 per cent, as the town population increased to 1,138 aged 3 or over by 2011. The drop in Welsh usage in Newcastle Emlyn between 2001 and 2011 was among the biggest in Wales, though not uncommon across Ceredigion and Carmarthenshire.

The latest Estyn inspection report in 2012 on the town's English-medium secondary school notes that only 12 per cent of pupils came from homes where Welsh is spoken, with 31 per cent considered fluent in the language. Parents have the option of sending their children to a designated Welsh-medium secondary school, Ysgol Dyffryn Teifi in Llandysul, Ceredigion. Only 64.8 per cent of the town's residents were born in Wales.

The town has a dual-language primary school, and also a pre-school establishment known as Meithrinfa Teifi Tots Nursery.

Sports
Newcastle Emlyn has association football and rugby teams. Newcastle Emlyn Football Club are members of the Football Association of Wales and Newcastle Emlyn RFC of the Welsh Rugby Union.

Legend

A legend of the Wyvern of Newcastle Emlyn (Gwiber Castell Newydd Emlyn) tells how on a fair day when the town was full, a winged wyvern breathing fire and smoke landed on the castle walls, stared threateningly, then settled down to sleep. The general terror gave way to an effort by a few townsfolk to destroy it. A soldier waded the Teifi to a vantage point on the castle side and released a red cloak into the river. The creature, suddenly woken, caught sight of the cloak, fell on it with shrieks and tore it to shreds, but was shot in its vulnerable underparts. The assailant escaped to safety. The dying wyvern turned over and floated down the river, its wound gushing venom that fouled the water and killed all the fish. There was joy at the monster's death.

Twin town
 Plonévez-Porzay, Brittany, France

Notable people

In birth order:
Evan Herber Evans (1836–1896), Congregational minister
Allen Raine (1836–1908), novelist
Peter Rees Jones (1843–1905), founder of Peter Jones department store
Owen Picton Davies (1872–1940), Liberal Party politician and hotel proprietor 
Martyn Lloyd-Jones (1899–1981), Evangelical leader, buried in the town
John Elwyn (1916–1997), British painter, illustrator and educator, Adpar
Dill Jones (1923–1984), jazz stride pianist
Helen Thomas (1966–1989), peace campaigner at Greenham Common
Josh Turnbull (born 1988) Welsh rugby union international from Newcastle Emlyn RFC
Scott Williams (born 1990), Welsh rugby union international from Newcastle Emlyn RFC

References

External links

Local history of Newcastle Emlyn

 
Towns in Carmarthenshire
Towns in Ceredigion
Communities in Carmarthenshire